The Crocodile Bird is a 1993 novel by British writer Ruth Rendell.

1993 British novels
Novels by Ruth Rendell
Hutchinson (publisher) books
Crown Publishing Group books
Doubleday Canada books